Eagle County Charter Academy is a K-8 charter school located in Edwards, Colorado. It opened in the 1994 school year with grades 5–7, adding 8th grade the next year, 1-4 by 2001 and Kindergarten in 2004. It has been recognized as a John Irwin School of Excellence. In 2004-2008 it received a grade of 'Excellent' from the state, based upon the performance of its students in the Colorado Student Assessment Program. There are 16-21 students in each class, creating grades of 32-42 kids.

References

Charter schools in Colorado
Schools in Eagle County, Colorado
Educational institutions established in 1994
Public elementary schools in Colorado
Public middle schools in Colorado
1994 establishments in Colorado